Srednji Gasteraj is a settlement in the Slovene Hills in northeastern Slovenia. It lies in the Municipality of Sveti Jurij v Slovenskih Goricah. The area is part of the traditional region of Styria. It is now included in the Drava Statistical Region.

References

External links
Srednji Gasteraj at Geopedia

Populated places in the Municipality of Sveti Jurij v Slovenskih Goricah